Howard Lake or Lake Howard may refer to:

Lakes
Canada
 Howard Lake (British Columbia)
 Howard Lake (Northwest Territories)

United States
 Howard Lake (Mendocino County), California
 Howard Lake (central Mendocino County), California
 Lake Howard (Winter Haven, Florida)
 Howard Lake (Cook County, Minnesota)
 Howard Lake, Scott County, Minnesota
 Howard Lake (Wright County, Minnesota)
 Howard Lake (Washington)

Settlements 
 Lake Howard, Alabama
 Howard Lake, Minnesota

See also
 Howard Prairie Lake, a reservoir in Jackson County, Oregon, United States